The Ornithorhynchidae  are one of the two extant families in the order Monotremata, and contain the platypus and its extinct relatives. The other family is the Tachyglossidae, or echidnas.  Within the Ornithorhynchidae are the genera Monotrematum, Obdurodon, and Ornithorhynchus:

Family Ornithorhynchidae
Genus † Monotrematum 
†Monotrematum sudamericanum
Genus †Obdurodon — an ancient branch of the platypus family
†Obdurodon dicksoni
†Obdurodon insignis
†Obdurodon tharalkooschild
Genus Ornithorhynchus
Ornithorhynchus anatinus (the modern platypus)
†Ornithorhynchus maximus

Another two genera, Steropodon and Teinolophos, were originally thought to belong to the Ornithorhynchidae. However, they were both placed into a new family, the Steropodontidae. This decision was made based on differences in the dentary recovered from the Griman Creek Formation, Lightning Ridge, New South Wales, Australia. This dentary is the holotype for the genus Steropodon,  thus the lack of information led to the original misclassification. Further research on Teinolophos has indeed shown it to be an animal much different from ornithochrynchids, lacking a beak, possessing a more complete mammalian dentition, and retaining primitive ears connected to the jaw as in more basal mammals. In 2022 it was proposed to move Steropodon into its own family, Teinolophidae.

The extinct Ornithorhynchus maximus has been included in Ornithorhynchus, but later placed with the echidna family Tachyglossidae as Zaglossus robustus.

References

 

 
Taxa named by John Edward Gray
Extant Selandian first appearances